The Peitav Synagogue or Peitav-Shul is the only synagogue in Riga to have survived the Holocaust and to be currently active. It is a center of the Latvian Jewish community and recognized by the Latvian government as an architectural monument of national significance.

The Synagogue was built 1903-1905, designed by architect Wilhelm Neumann in an art nouveau style. When Riga's synagogues were burned in 1941 by the Nazis and their Latvian collaborators, the Peitav Synagogue was the only one to survive because of its location in the Old Town, adjacent to other buildings. Subsequently, during World War II, the synagogue was used as a warehouse.

Under Soviet rule, the Synagogue was one of the relatively few allowed to remain open in the Soviet Union. After Latvian independence was restored in 1991, the Synagogue was damaged by bombings in 1995 and 1998.

A restoration of the Synagogue, partly funded by the European Union and by the Latvian government, was completed in 2009. The dedication ceremony was attended by Latvia's president Valdis Zatlers and prime minister Valdis Dombrovskis as well as by Israeli Diaspora Affairs Minister Yuli-Yoel Edelstein.

Gallery

References 

1905 establishments in the Russian Empire
Art Nouveau architecture in Riga
Art Nouveau synagogues
Ashkenazi Jewish culture in Latvia
Ashkenazi synagogues
Orthodox Judaism in Latvia
Orthodox synagogues
Synagogues completed in 1905
Synagogues in Riga